The Wenatchee Valley Skyhawks are a professional indoor football team based in Wenatchee, Washington, that began playing football in 2019 with home games at the Town Toyota Center.  It is the first team to play in the Wenatchee Valley since the Wenatchee Valley Venom of the Indoor Football League in 2011.  They are owned by Hook Sports Media, LLC.

History
On October 15, 2018, the American West Football Conference (AWFC) was founded by the Idaho Horsemen and added the Skyhawks, Reno Express, and Tri-Cities Fire to create the league. 

Prior to the planned start of the 2020 AWFC season, the Tri-Cities Fire folded leading to the Skyhawks deciding to play an independent schedule. The league then tried to move forward with three teams — Idaho, Wenatchee, and the expansion Yakima Canines — following the withdrawal of the Reno Express from the league with non-league teams filling for the newly vacant dates. The AWFC then postponed the 2020 season due to the ongoing COVID-19 pandemic and then cancelled the season entirely due to the unavailability of arenas during the pandemic. The AWFC played the 2021 season, adding two teams in the Oregon High Desert Storm and Tri-City Rush, but the Skyhawks were unable to play any home games due to their home arena, the Town Toyota Center, being used for as a pandemic relief center and vaccination site.

In 2022 The Skyhawks were able to play home games. They posted a 6-4 record and Went to the American West Bowl III where they lost 32-57 to the Tri City Rush.

Season-by-season records

References

External links
 Official website
 American West Football Conference website

Wenatchee, Washington
American football teams established in 2018
2018 establishments in Washington (state)
American football teams in Washington (state)